Eleftherios Konsolas (born 17 December 1988) is a Greek rower. He participated in the 2012 Summer Olympics in London where he competed in the Men's lightweight double sculls event together with his teammate Panagiotis Magdanis. They qualified for the B finals, where they reached a second place, finishing in 8th place overall.

Konsolas and Magdanis won the silver in the lightweight double sculls at the 2011 European Championships.

In 2012, the team of Konsolas, Nikolaos Afentoulis, Georgios Konsolas and Panagiotis Magdanis won silver in the men's lightweight quadruple sculls at the 2012 World Championship.

Konsolas was part of the Greek team that won the lightweight quadruple sculls at the 2013 and 2014 World Championships.  On both occasions, the team consisted of Konsolas, Georgios Konsolas, Spyridon Giannaros and Panagiotis Magdanis.  In 2014, the team set a world record in the event.

Konsolas won bronze at the 2016 and 2017 World Championships in the men's lightweight quadruple sculls.  The 2016 team was the same as the world championship winning team.  In 2017 rowed with Nikos Nikolaidis, Panagiotis Magdanis and Spyridon Giannaros.

References

1988 births
Living people
Rowers at the 2012 Summer Olympics
Greek male rowers
Olympic rowers of Greece
World Rowing Championships medalists for Greece
Mediterranean Games gold medalists for Greece
Mediterranean Games medalists in rowing
Competitors at the 2013 Mediterranean Games
Rowers from Athens